Kevin Godfrey (born 24 February 1960) is an English retired football winger who made over 540 career appearances, most notably in the Football League for Leyton Orient and Brentford.

Playing career

Leyton Orient 
A winger, Godfrey came through the youth ranks at Second Division club Leyton Orient (then named "Orient") and signed a professional contract in March 1977. He made his debut during the 1977–78 season and finishing the campaign with a handful of appearances. Godfrey had to wait until the 1981–82 season to make a breakthrough, appearing in 42 league matches of a disastrous season which saw the Os relegated to the Third Division.

Godfrey found his best form between 1983 and 1985, making over 40 appearances over the course of three seasons and scoring 10 or more goals in each. Now playing in the Fourth Division after another relegation, Godfrey fell out of favour during the 1985–86 season, making just 16 appearances, but he regained his place in the following campaign and made another 70 appearances before departing at the end of the 1987–88 season. Godfrey made 343 appearances and scored 72 goals during his 11 years at Brisbane Road. In recognition of his service, Godfrey was awarded a testimonial in August 1987.

Plymouth Argyle (loan) 
Godfrey joined Third Division high-flyers Plymouth Argyle on loan in March 1986. His seven appearances brought about a positive reaction to the team's dip in form and he scored one goal during his spell, a late winner versus Bristol Rovers.

Brentford 
Godfrey joined Third Division club Brentford during the 1988 off-season, initially to get fit, but he became a regular member in the team after forwards Gary Blissett, Richard Cadette and Neil Smillie suffered injuries. He again deputised for Blissett in the early part of the 1989–90 season, before moving back to the wing to cover for the injured Eddie May. Godfrey's best season with Brentford came in 1990–91, when he made 46 appearances and scored six goals, including one against Tranmere Rovers in the Bees' unsuccessful 1991 Third Division play-off campaign.

He won the first silverware of his career in Brentford's historic 1991–92 season, in which they won the Third Division title. Godfrey made many of his 31 appearances as a central midfielder, excelling. Aged 32 and playing in the second-tier for the first time since 1982, Godfrey made 21 appearances during the 1992–93 season and scored a last-minute goal versus Swindon Town in the preliminary round of the Anglo-Italian Cup. With the Bees relegated back to the third-tier at the first time of asking, Godfrey was released during the 1993 off-season. He made 190 appearances and scored 25 goals during his five years at Griffin Park.

Yeading 
Godfrey ended his career with a spell at Isthmian League Premier Division club Yeading during the 1993–94 season.

Personal life 
After retiring from football, Godfrey became a taxi driver in West London and later worked for security delivery company.

Honours 
Brentford
Football League Third Division: 1991–92

Career statistics

References

1960 births
People from Kennington
Footballers from the London Borough of Lambeth
English footballers
Brentford F.C. players
English Football League players
Leyton Orient F.C. players
Yeading F.C. players
Plymouth Argyle F.C. players
Association football wingers
Living people
Association football forwards
Isthmian League players